Assessor is a genus of ray-finned fishes which belong to the longfin family Plesiopidae. They are found in the western Pacific Ocean from Japan to Australia.

Species
Three species are currently recognised as belonging to Assessor:

 Assessor flavissimus Allen & Kuiter, 1976 (yellow devilfish)
 Assessor macneilli Whitley, 1935 (blue devilfish)
 Assessor randalli Allen & Kuiter, 1976 (Randall's devilfish)

References

Plesiopinae